Kasturchand Park is a metro station on the Orange Line of the Nagpur Metro serving the Kasturchand Park area of Nagpur. It was opened on 21 August 2021.

Station Layout

References

Nagpur Metro stations
Railway stations in India opened in 2021